The Quantel Paintbox was a dedicated computer graphics workstation for composition of broadcast television video and graphics. Produced by the British production equipment manufacturer Quantel (which, via a series of mergers, is now part of Grass Valley), its design emphasized the studio workflow efficiency required for live news production.

Following its initial launch in 1981, the Paintbox revolutionised the production of television graphics.

History 

The first generation Paintbox, the 1981 DPB-7001, was built from readily-available off-the-shelf components, supported by Programmable Array Logic ICs which were custom-programmed by Quantel.

Artist Martin Holbrook worked with Quantel's development team to develop the artist-oriented functionality and user interface, which remained virtually unchanged throughout the life of the product; the custom developed pressure-sensitive pen which proved the killer app.

Released in 1989 modernized and more compact model; aside from internal hardware improvements, the new keyboard and cordless pen also introduced.

From the end of lifespan of Paintbox V line most of his features was also integrated into the latest Quantel Henry, and in 1993 the Quantel Editbox were merged the both lines.

In contrast to the earlier DPB-7000 series machines, the V-series made extensive use of Altera CPLD and FPGA ICs, which integrated much of the complex SSI logic into a smaller number of ICs. Some versions of the V-series hardware refined the design further by moving the CPLD and FPGA logic into "hard-copy" ASICs, which were manufactured by Orbit Semiconductor.

In the late 1980s, Quantel embarked on lawsuits against the Adobe Photoshop software package and the Spaceward Graphics Matisse system in an attempt to protect patented aspects of the Paintbox system. They won the initial case against Spaceward in 1990, but finally lost the case against Adobe in 1997 following depositions and demonstrations by a number of Computer Graphics pioneers including Alvy Ray Smith and Dick Phillips. Richard Shoup ported his 1973 paint program SuperPaint to Windows for demonstration purposes, and was able to demonstrate that Superpaint had particular features before Quantel's Paintbox. Shoup's port is available for download from his personal website.

In 2002, the generationQ series of products introduced the last stand-alone Paintbox and the QPaintbox software for PCs. Eventually, Paintbox became a feature of Quantel's other, more powerful editing, media management and post-production products.

In 2005 Quantel update the line of X86-based workstations (with Paintbox and Paintbox gQ models, and QPaintbox software-only version). The new Quantel Editbox also released.

Despite becoming the industry standard TV graphics and post production computer with hundreds sold around the world, Quantel lost all its market share against cheaper systems and software. There are just fifteen V-Series models and only five original DPB versions known to still exist, one of which is being restored to working order.

Uses 

Paintbox was used to create the poster for The Silence of The Lambs, JFK, The Doors and record covers for Nirvana's Nevermind, and the Beastie Boys' Paul's Boutique. The Miracle, rock band Queen's studio album, was designed by Richard Gray and created by Richard Baker.

It was used by six artists and designers, including David Hockney and Richard Hamilton, to create original artwork in the 1987 BBC series Painting with Light. Quantel also gave three Paintbox systems to various UK art schools in the UK in the mid 1980's, including Blackpool College where it was used extensively by artist Adrian Wilson to create digital images, including the James album cover for Gold Mother.

Two of Wilson's Paintbox pieces were included in the pioneering Art & Computers exhibition at the Cleveland Art Gallery, England, September 1988 and he was sponsored by Quantel, who used his images for the cover of the Graphic Paintbox sales brochure. One recipient, Duncan of Jordanstone College of Art had recently appointed the video artist Stephen Partridge as a lecturer who then established (1984) The Television Workshop to support artists and filmmakers' production and access to high-level broadcast technology. Over 400 productions were supported in this way from 1984 to 1992 until desktop video pre-empted the need. Artists and filmmakers using the workshop included Richard Morrison, Jeff Keen, Robert Cahen, Tamara Krikorian, Pictorial Heroes, Judith Goddard and many others.

The music video for Dire Straits' Money for Nothing was created on a Bosch FGS-4000 3D animation system using a Quantel Paintbox for backgrounds and textures.

Graphics for Disney Sing-Along Songs were also created on a Paintbox.

See also 

 Video Toaster

References

External links 

 Alvy Ray Smith - Digital Paint Systems. Includes information about the Quantel/Adobe lawsuit.
 Computer Graphics in Court: The Adobe/Quantel Case
 A history of the Quantel paintbox (archived from http://blog.quantel.eu/2011/03/the-quantel-paintbox-a-pioneering-computer-graphics-workstation/
 Quantel Paintbox training video, Quantel, 1994
 Paintbox V-series promotional video

Computer workstations
Film and video technology
Quantel
Computer-related introductions in 1981